World War X is the seventh studio album by American deathcore band Carnifex. It was released on August 2, 2019 through Nuclear Blast. The album was self-produced by the band and Jason Suecof. This would be the last album with lead guitarist Jordan Lockrey.

Background and recording
On July 5, 2018, Carnifex announced that they are writing new material for the forthcoming album. On January 17, 2019, the band begun recording the new album. On June 4, a tease of a new song from their album was posted through their social media accounts. On June 5, Carnifex revealed that Alissa White-Gluz, vocalist of Arch Enemy, would be featuring in their new song. On June 6, they revealed the album itself, the album cover, the track list, and release date.

Critical reception

The album received positive reviews from critics. Consequence gave the album a positive review and stated: "Overall, World War X is an absolute rush. The band's ability to blend feeling and raw heaviness once again allows them to release a work of awesome brutality. With World War X, Carnifex continue to prove themselves as one of deathcore's leading acts." Sophie Maughan of Distorted Sound scored the album 8 out of 10 and said: "Whether World War X will become known as Carnifex's magnum opus remains to be seen. What they have created with album number seven however, is a record that's undeterred or defined by genre limitations. This is deathcore diversified – and it's an audio-sensory sojourn worth embracing."

MetalSucks rated the album 3.5 out of 5 and said: "Although I can't imagine this will be the defining album of Carnifex's career, it's an accessible one, and longtime Carnifex fans should find something to enjoy." Simon Crampton of Rock Sins rated the album 8 out of 10 and said: "World War X clocks in at just over 35 minutes and flys by far too quickly. A lean muscular album that packs a hefty punch. Showcasing Carnifex in all of their glory, this a disgustingly heavy record made by a band that has matured and grown from strength with each record who are now starting to reach their full potential. It might be too early to tell if this will go down as Carnifex's defining album, but the evidence is certainly there. The future the band speaks of may be bleak but their real-world counterpart is anything but."

Track listing
Adapted from Apple Music.

Personnel
Credits adapted from AllMusic.

Carnifex
 Scott Lewis – lead vocals
 Jordan Lockrey – lead guitar, engineering
 Cory Arford – rhythm guitar, backing vocals
 Fred Calderon – bass
 Shawn Cameron – drums, engineering

Additional musicians
 Mick Kenney – additional vocals, programming
 Alissa White-Gluz – guest vocals on track 5
 Angel Vivaldi – guest guitar solo on track 6
 Cassie Morris – piano

Additional personnel
 Jason Suecof – production, engineering, guitar solo
 Carnifex – production
 Ronn Miller – assistant engineering
 John Douglass – mixing
 Ted Jensen – mastering
 Blake Armstrong – cover art
 Marcelo Vasco – layout

References

2019 albums
Carnifex (band) albums
Nuclear Blast albums